French was the official language of Vietnam under French colonial rule during the 19th and early 20th centuries. After 1954, French fell into disuse in North Vietnam, and maintained a high status in South Vietnam. Since the Fall of Saigon in 1975, French has declined in modern Vietnam: in 2018, under 1% of the population was fluent in French.

Vietnam is the largest Francophone country in Asia and is a member of the Organisation internationale de la Francophonie (OIF). Today, the Vietnamese government in cooperation with the French government is initiating plans to promote and increase French-language education in the country's schooling system, acknowledging the cultural and historic value of the French language.

History
The French language's presence in Vietnam began in the 18th century when French explorers and merchants began sailing near the Indochina coast. When the French replaced the Portuguese as the primary European power in Southeast Asia in the 1790s by helping to unify Vietnam under the Nguyen Dynasty and later colonizing Southern Vietnam, they introduced the French language to locals. French became the governing language of French Indochina, which included present-day Vietnam, Laos and Cambodia. Many Vietnamese began learning French, which replaced the native Vietnamese and royal court Chinese languages; and eventually the Latin alphabet became the official script of the Vietnamese language. The building of missionary and government schools spread the French language among educated Vietnamese and it soon became the language of the elite classes by the end of the nineteenth century. By the early twentieth century, the French language began spreading to the urban masses and became the primary language of education. A French pidgin called Tây Bồi was developed among Vietnamese servants in French households and those who spoke partial French. Nevertheless, at the French language's height in Vietnam between the 1900s and 1940s, many Vietnamese did not speak French well or learn the language and some revolutionaries refused to learn the colonial language, though ironically speeches and papers written to promote independence were written in French. During World War II, Japan briefly occupied Vietnam and established Vietnamese as the sole official and educational language.

The influence of the French language in Vietnam slowly began to decline after World War II as revolutionary movements increased and their works began to be written more in Vietnamese. Poorer and generally, more rural populations began to resist French rule and guerrilla forces, the Viet Minh attacked the French and sparked the First Indochina War. 
The French language however, continued its presence in government, education and media in areas not held by the Viet Minh. At the Battle of Dien Bien Phu in 1954, the Viet Minh defeated the French and Vietnam gained its independence, though the nation was soon divided into a communist, Soviet-orientated north, and a capitalist, US-orientated government in the south. Fearing persecution by the communist government, hundreds of thousands fled to the south, including French-educated and speaking elite. Despite the Vietnam War erupting shortly afterwards, French continued a healthy presence in South Vietnam, where it was an administrative and educational language. The sharpest decline of the French language in Vietnam was after the Fall of Saigon in 1975 as the communist government imposed Vietnamese as the sole official and educational language on the entire nation, including the south, which was in a transitional phase until 1976.

The number of students receiving their education in French in Vietnam declined to about 40% by the 1980s and continued to decline well into the 1990s. Additionally, many French-speakers who were anti-communist fled Vietnam and immigrated to nations such as the United States, France, Canada (most particularly Quebec and Ontario) and Australia. As of 2000, only about 5% of students received their education in French. Meanwhile, the rise of the English language caused a further decline in the status of French in Vietnam as English became seen as the language of international trade, commerce and diplomacy. While English has displaced French as the most studied first foreign language, since the 2000s, a revival of French has been taking place in Vietnamese education.

Citing historic, sociopolitical, and cultural contexts, the Vietnamese government has implemented projects to promote or reintegrate French into education systems, especially at the secondary and higher levels. Notably, many university programs in engineering, science, medicine, and law remain taught in French and an increasing number of schools in urban areas such as Hanoi, Ho Chi Minh City, and Cần Thơ use the language as either the main medium of instruction or alongside Vietnamese. Teacher training programs to enhance the quality of French instruction have been agreed upon with France, Belgium, Canada, and the other Francophone Asian countries of Laos and Cambodia. Vietnam has also become a destination for students from other parts of Asia to come and study the French language. The nation remains a member of La Francophonie. Furthermore, French has somewhat of a diplomatic language position in Vietnam.

Current status
Official figures in 2019 estimate that about 675,000 Vietnamese are fluent in French, many of whom are older individuals educated during the colonial era. Its usage in everyday life has greatly declined since 1975, however, with the number of people using French on a regular basis being between 5,000 to 6,000. A significant number of French words entered into the everyday Vietnamese lexicon during the French colonial era. 

French retains a strong influence on Vietnamese education and society despite the rise of English language education facilitated by American-influenced globalization. The number of schools and university programs reimplementing or teaching French has greatly increased since the first decade of the 21st century. This is in large part due to government policies promoting the knowledge of more than one foreign language, with French and English as priority second languages. French also continues to be regarded as a cultural language in Vietnam, with its usage associated with the elite society and links to family tradition and national history, while English and other foreign languages are regarded as commercial vernaculars used with foreigners.

Dialect characteristics

Vietnamese French is based on standard French, but contains words that have been influenced not only by Vietnamese but also by Chinese and English, the latter due to U.S. presence in the south during the Vietnam War. Additionally, the pronoun  used as the formal and plural form of you can be used not only to address elders but also to adults of the same age unlike Standard French, where  is used among adult friends of the same age.

Despite these minor differences, the form of French taught at Vietnamese schools and colleges is that of standard French.

Influence on Vietnamese

The Vietnamese language contains a significant number of French loanwords and placenames. The majority of words having French origin are those relating to objects, food and technology introduced to the Vietnamese during the colonial era.  Additionally, the Vietnamese alphabet came to be written in a Latin-based script instead of Chữ Hán traditionally used by the former royal court. It became heavily promoted by the French colonial government, which got rid of Chinese influence on the Vietnamese education system by imposing a French-based system.

Below are some notable words that have made their way into standard Vietnamese from French:

Media
Despite the decline of French in the late 1970s to 2000s following communist insurgency, Vietnam continues to have a French-media market and presence. A small number of French-language newspapers used to circulate in the country, most dominantly the now extinct Saigon Eco and the only remaining state-owned paper - Le Courrier du Vietnam. News broadcasts as well as television programs in French are shown on Vietnamese television channels daily. Radio broadcasts in French are also present. French influence continues to exist to this day, in the form of loan words or otherwise.

See also

French language in Laos
French language in Cambodia
French Indochina
French Cochinchina
Annam (French protectorate)
Tonkin (French protectorate)

Notes and references 

 Vu Ngu Chieu (February 1986). "The Other Side of the 1945 Vietnamese Revolution: The Empire of Viet-Nam". Journal of Asian Studies. 45 (2).

External links
 Official website of Le Courrier du Vietnam
 Official website of La Francophonie

Vietnam
Languages of Vietnam
French dialects
France–Vietnam relations